In geometry, an icositetrahedron is a polyhedron with 24 faces. There are many symmetric forms, and the ones with highest symmetry have chiral icosahedral symmetry:

Four Catalan solids, convex:
 Triakis octahedron -  isosceles triangles
 Tetrakis hexahedron - isosceles triangles
 Deltoidal icositetrahedron - kites
 Pentagonal icositetrahedron - pentagons

27 uniform star-polyhedral duals: (self-intersecting)
 Small rhombihexacron, Great rhombihexacron
 Small hexacronic icositetrahedron, Great hexacronic icositetrahedron
 Great deltoidal icositetrahedron
 Great triakis octahedron

References 

Polyhedra